Co-op Academy North Manchester, formerly  known as Manchester Creative and Media Academy, is a secondary school located in Blackley, Manchester, UK. First established in 2009, the school relocated to a brand new building in 2012 costing about £3.5 Million. The school offers high school education from year 7–11.

In 2015, the school was taken over by the Co-operative Academies Trust.

References

2009 establishments in England
Educational institutions established in 2009
Secondary schools in Manchester
Academies in Manchester